Manuel da Fonseca e Castro was a Portuguese footballer who played as a forward.

External links 
 
 

Portuguese footballers
Association football forwards
Portugal international footballers
Year of birth missing